Enteractinococcus coprophilus is a bacterium from the genus of Enteractinococcus which has been isolated from the faeces of the Panthera tigris amoyensis from the Yunnan Wild Animal Park in China.

References

Bacteria described in 2012
Micrococcaceae